John Bishop's Britain was a British television programme presented by comedian John Bishop. Each programme had a theme, for example food. It featured stand-up, sketches and real-life stories from celebrity guests and members of the public on that particular topic. There have been two series filmed to date. A 2011 Christmas special was filmed and broadcast around the Christmas period of that year.

The show is filmed in front of an audience, where the audience are shown the interviews via video link as part of the filming. The sketches are not shown to the audience at the time of filming but Bishop's narration of the sketch is included in the filming. In the sketches, Bishop is portrayed by model Tommy Maxwell. TV host Rylan Clark-Neal rose to fame from this show.

Episode list

Series 1 (2010)

Series 2 (2011)

References

External links

2010 British television series debuts
2011 British television series endings
British stand-up comedy television series
BBC television sketch shows
Television series by All3Media